The Goddess of Ganymede is a science fiction novel by American writer Mike Resnick.  It was first published in book form in 1967 by Donald M. Grant, Publisher, Inc. in an edition of 750 copies.

Plot introduction
The novel concerns Adam Thane, a soldier of fortune who fights for the woman he loves against the immortals of Ganymede.

Sources

1967 American novels
1967 science fiction novels
American science fiction novels
Fiction set on Ganymede (moon)
Donald M. Grant, Publisher books